A chipmunk is a small, striped squirrel.

Chipmunk may also refer to:
 Alvin and the Chipmunks, a fictional musical group
 Audio time stretching and pitch scaling, known as The Chipmunk effect
 de Havilland Canada DHC-1 Chipmunk, a two-seat, propeller-driven training aircraft
 Chip 'n' Dale, Walt Disney cartoon chipmunks
 Chip (rapper), a British rapper also known as Chipmunk
 Chipmunk (software), a physics engine
 A type of noise sometimes made by an internal combustion engine's wastegate
 Thirteen-lined ground squirrel, sometimes incorrectly referred to as a chipmunk

See also
 Chip Monck, an American lighting designer